Janesa Jaida "Nessa" Barrett (born August 6, 2002) is an American singer. She has released one EP, Pretty Poison (2021), and one studio album, Young Forever (2022).

Early life
Barrett is of Puerto Rican descent and was born and grew up in Galloway Township, New Jersey, where she struggled as being the only Puerto Rican and, after her parents divorced, one of the few students living in an apartment with a single mother. Her father, Drew Barrett (born 1980), is a rapper, actor, and motivational speaker, who had a music studio at home. She has a younger brother named Julian.

Barrett said she has been writing songs "since [she] could walk and talk".

Career

2019–2021: Career beginnings and Pretty Poison
In 2019, Barrett began posting videos on TikTok, which led to a recording contract from Warner Records. In July 2020, she released her piano-based ballad debut single "Pain".

In October 2020, she released her second single, "If U Love Me". In December 2020, Barrett released a dark interpretation of "Santa Baby". In February 2021, Barrett released the track "La Di Die", which explores the downfalls of fame with Jxdn, produced by Travis Barker. Barrett and Jxdn, along with Barker, performed the single live for the first time on the April 7, 2021 episode of Jimmy Kimmel Live! and performed the song again on The Ellen DeGeneres Show on April 12, 2021.

On June 25, 2021, Barrett released "Counting Crimes", a song said by Barrett to be "about moving on from something toxic."  

In August 2021, her song "I Hope Ur Miserable Until Ur Dead" debuted at number 88 on the Billboard Hot 100, Barrett's first entry on the list.

Her debut EP, Pretty Poison, containing seven new tracks, was released on September 10, 2021, coinciding with World Suicide Prevention Day.

2022–present: Young Forever
Barrett released the single "Dying on the Inside" in February 2022.

In June 2022, Barrett released "Die First" as the lead single from her debut studio album. The song is dedicated to her best friend, Cooper Noriega, who had recently died of an accidental drug overdose. In the track, Barrett sings about hoping to never go through the pain of losing her mom, praying that she will be the first to die out of the two of them. 

On September 9, 2022, she released "Madhouse", the second single on the album. The song addresses mental health problems along with slut-shaming and bullying.

In October 2022, she released both "Tired of California", the third single on the album, and the entire album, "Young Forever" (stylized in all lowercase). 

In December 2022, she announced her Young Forever Tour featuring Isabel LaRosa, playing twenty shows starting in February 2023. In February 2023 she released a single BANG BANG!

Artistry
Barrett cites Arctic Monkeys, Lana Del Rey, Melanie Martinez, and The Neighbourhood as influences on both her sound and her aesthetic as a musician.

Personal life
Barrett has been open about her mental health issues, including depression, borderline personality disorder, suicidal thoughts, and eating disorders. She started therapy at age 6 and made her first suicide attempt at age 14 by overdosing on a analgesic, after which she was admitted to a psychiatric hospital. When she was 17 years old, after her parents objected, she ran away from home to live in Los Angeles, where she expected more career opportunities. When she was 18, she was diagnosed with borderline personality disorder. She made another suicide attempt in 2022 after her best friend, Cooper Noriega, died of an accidental drug overdose. Her manager then admitted her to a psychiatric hospital.

In an interview with Zach Sang, Barrett proclaimed that her faith in Christianity helped her through her mental health issues and the death of her friend and that these made her become more religious.

Barrett is 4 feet, 11 inches tall and has insecurity about her height.

Barrett identifies as bisexual. She began dating fellow TikTok star Josh Richards in November 2019, but broke up in March 2021. She then dated Jaden Hossler (Jxdn) but broke up in May 2022.

Discography

Studio albums

EPs

Singles

Awards and nominations
Barrett was named to Billboard's "21 Under 21" and was featured on Ones to Watch's list of "25 Artists to Watch in 2022", Uproxx's "Next Hitmakers List" and People's Emerging Artist List.

References

Living people
People from Galloway Township, New Jersey
Singers from New Jersey
Songwriters from New Jersey
Warner Records artists
People with borderline personality disorder
2002 births